Srikant Kumar Jena (born 18 June 1950), is an Indian politician hailing from Ratnagiri, Jajpur district, Odisha. He was the Union Cabinet Minister for Parliamentary Affairs and Tourism in the Gujral ministry and Deve Gowda ministry He was the Minister of State(Independent charge) for Chemicals & Fertilizers and Statistics & Programme Implementation in the Second Manmohan Singh ministry. He was Union Minister of State, Small Scale Industry, Agro and Rural Industries in the V. P. Singh ministry. He represented the Balasore parliamentary constituency in the 15th Lok Sabha.	

He had been elected as MLA in Odisha Legislative Assembly, three times between 1977 and 1989. In 1979–80, he held the post of Minister of State, Industry and Urban Development, Govt. of Odisha. He got elected to Lok Sabha for the first time in 1989 and then subsequently three more times to 9th Lok Sabha, 10th Lok Sabha and 15th Lok Sabha in 1991, 1996 and 2001 respectively. In 2019 he was expelled from congress party on the charge of anti-party activities. Before joining Indian National Congress, he was party member of Janata Dal.

He did his B.A. from at Kendrapara College, Utkal University, Bhubaneswar, Odisha.

See also
 Indian general election in Orissa, 2009
 Odisha Pradesh Congress Committee

References

External links
 Official biographical sketch in Parliament of India website

People from Odisha
Odisha politicians
Indian National Congress politicians
India MPs 1991–1996
India MPs 2009–2014
1950 births
Living people
Lok Sabha members from Odisha
State cabinet ministers of Odisha
Janata Dal politicians
India MPs 1989–1991
People from Balasore district
People from Cuttack district
People from Jajpur district
People from Kendrapara district
India MPs 1996–1997
Janata Party politicians
Janata Party (Secular) politicians
Indian National Congress politicians from Odisha